Samuel Yohou (born 6 August 1991) is a professional footballer who plays as a defender for Super League Greece club OFI. Born in France, Yohou represents the Ivory Coast internationally.

Club career
Yohou made his professional debut for Paris FC on 11 August 2015, playing the first half of the Coupe de la Ligue defeat against Metz before being replaced by Tiécoro Keita.

On 31 August 2021, he signed a two-year contract with Dunkerque.

On 27 July 2022, Yohou moved to OFI in Greece on a two-year contract.

International career
Yohou represented the Ivory Coast U20 in the 2011 Toulon Tournament.

Career statistics

References

External links
 
 Paris FC Profile

1991 births
Living people
People from Villepinte, Seine-Saint-Denis
Footballers from Seine-Saint-Denis
Ivorian footballers
Ivory Coast under-20 international footballers
French sportspeople of Ivorian descent
French footballers
Association football defenders
Paris FC players
SAS Épinal players
AS Béziers (2007) players
Tuzlaspor players
USL Dunkerque players
OFI Crete F.C. players
Ligue 2 players
Championnat National players
Championnat National 3 players
TFF First League players
Ivorian expatriate footballers
Expatriate footballers in Turkey
Ivorian expatriate sportspeople in Turkey
Expatriate footballers in Greece
Ivorian expatriate sportspeople in Greece